Milan Chovanec (born 31 January 1970) is a Czech politician who served as Minister of the Interior of the Czech Republic in the Cabinet of Prime Minister Bohuslav Sobotka from 2014 to 2017 and served as acting Leader of the Czech Social Democratic Party from June 2017 to February 2018. He was also a Member of the Chamber of Deputies of the Czech Republic from 26 October 2013 until his resignation on 14 April 2019. Previously he served as governor of Pilsen Region between 2010 and 2014 and as Member of Pilsen Town Council from 2002 until 2010.

References 

1970 births
Czech Social Democratic Party MPs
Interior ministers of the Czech Republic
Living people
Politicians from Plzeň
Czech Social Democratic Party governors
Czech Social Democratic Party Government ministers
Leaders of the Czech Social Democratic Party
University of West Bohemia alumni
Members of the Chamber of Deputies of the Czech Republic (2017–2021)
Members of the Chamber of Deputies of the Czech Republic (2013–2017)